Primitives may refer to:
 Primitive decorating, American art style
 The Primitives, 1980s English alternative rock band
 The Primitives, alternative country band, precursor to Uncle Tupelo
 The Primitives, parody band formed in 1964 with Lou Reed and John Cale
 The Primitives, British band formed in 1965 and led by Mal Ryder, active in Italy from 1965 until 1970
 The Primitives, a 1962 British film directed by Alfred Travers
 The Primitives, a 1966 novelette by Frank Herbert
 Artists of the early International Gothic period of art, in particular:
 Early Renaissance painting 
 Early Netherlandish painting
 Primitives (stamps), crudely designed early postage stamps
 Primitives (album) by Bayonne

Computing
 Cryptographic primitives, low-level cryptographic algorithms frequently used to build computer security systems
Primitives (computer graphics), basic graphic elements such as lines or curves, used to create computer images

See also
Primitive (disambiguation)